Everything's OK may refer to:

 Everything's OK (EP), a 1998 EP by The Queers
 Everything's OK (album), a 2005 album by Al Green